Mount Anglem / Hananui is the highest point on New Zealand's Stewart Island / Rakiura. Following the passage of the Ngai Tahu Claims Settlement Act 1998, the name of the peak was officially altered to Mount Anglem / Hananui.

Views from Mount Anglem include those inland looking west onto the floodplains. The southern tip of the South Island is visible on a clear day.

References

Landforms of Stewart Island
Anglem